Torquigener hicksi, commonly known as Hicks's toadfish, is a fish of the pufferfish family Tetraodontidae native to northern Australia.

External links
 Fishes of Australia : Torquigener hicksi

Hicks' toadfish
Marine fish of Northern Australia
Hicks' toadfish